Star Time is an American variety series which aired on the DuMont Television Network from September 5, 1950, to February 27, 1951, and starred singer-actress Frances Langford. It was broadcast from 10 to 11 p.m. on Tuesdays.

Broadcast history
The hour-long comedy-variety show spotlighted several regulars and guest performers.  One feature of each telecast was a lengthy skit, written and directed by Philip Rapp, with Langford and Lew Parker performing as The Bickersons, a quarrelsome married couple that migrated from radio as a distinctively-unhappy sitcom man and wife. 
   
With Langford as a first-class singer, music was an integral component of the series.  The premier telecast spotlighted The Harmonicats, a trio of versatile harmonica players who had achieved great prominence in the 1940s.  But the program soon settled on a regular slot called Club Goodman in which the Benny Goodman Sextet—with Goodman, Teddy Wilson, and Terry Gibbs, among others—played jazz arrangements of popular songs.
   
With Wilson's weekly appearances, Star Time became one of the first sponsored national TV series to offer an African-American performer as a cast regular.

Star Time was an adaptation of the earlier radio series Drene Time, which had aired from 1946 to 1947.

Star Time originated from WABD, with Food Stores Corporation as its sponsor.

Episode status
 
The UCLA Film and Television Archive has four complete episodes, along with excerpts from a fifth episode.

The J. Fred and Leslie W. MacDonald Collection of the Library of Congress contains five half-hour segments of Star Time, including the first half-hour of the premiere telecast which featured The Harmonicats; plus an opening half-hour of another show; and three closing half-hour segments highlighting the Benny Goodman Sextet as well as The Bickersons skits.

See also
List of programs broadcast by the DuMont Television Network
List of surviving DuMont Television Network broadcasts
1950–51 United States network television schedule

Bibliography
David Weinstein, The Forgotten Network: DuMont and the Birth of American Television (Philadelphia: Temple University Press, 2004) 
Alex McNeil, Total Television, Fourth edition (New York: Penguin Books, 1980) 
Tim Brooks and Earle Marsh, The Complete Directory to Prime Time Network TV Shows, Third edition (New York: Ballantine Books, 1964)

References

External links
 
 DuMont historical website

1950 American television series debuts
1951 American television series endings
1950s American variety television series
Black-and-white American television shows
DuMont Television Network original programming
English-language television shows